Xanthoneura is an Indomalayan  genus of grass skippers in the family Hesperiidae.

Species
Xanthoneura corissa   (Hewitson, 1876)   
X. c. indrasana    (Elwes & de Nicéville, [1887])   Burma, Thailand, Laos, Malaya, Borneo
X. c. patmapana    (Fruhstorfer, 1911)   Java
Xanthoneura telesinus    (Mabille, 1878)    Philippines
Xanthoneura kazuhisai    Maruyama, 1989

References

Natural History Museum Lepidoptera genus database
Xanthoneura Eliot in Corbet & Pendlebury, 1978 at Markku Savela's Lepidoptera and Some Other Life Forms

Hesperiinae
Hesperiidae genera